Sadler Vaden is a guitarist, singer, songwriter and producer, best known as a member of Jason Isbell's band, The 400 Unit.

Biography 
Sadler Vaden was born on February 19, 1986, in Charlotte, North Carolina. He and his family moved to North Myrtle Beach, South Carolina when he was one and to Charleston, South Carolina. when he was twelve.  When Sadler was eighteen, his father died of alcoholism and on his twenty-first birthday, his mother passed away as a result of  breast cancer.

Sadler is married to his wife, Candace. They gave birth to their first son, Townshend (after Pete Townshend of The Who) in 2020.

Career 
Vaden began playing the guitar when he was a teenager and started his first band, a power trio called Leslie when he was eighteen. Vader and band opened for a number of national and regional artists, including Drivin N Cryin and Jason Isbell. Vaden joined Drivin N Cryin as a guitar player in 2011. He produced the bands' series of Songs EPs. In 2013, he was hired away by Jason Isbell to become guitarist in Isbells' band The 400 Unit. He has since appeared on all of their albums as of 2022, including 2017s The Nashville Sound, which won the Grammy for Best Americana Album.

His major influences include Oasis, George Harrison, Tom Petty and The Who.

Vaden as also released his own albums, starting with the self-titled Sadler Vaden for Glass Jaw Records in 2016. This was followed by Anybody Out There in 2020, which Vaden referred to as his "finest work to date"  and No Depression magazine described as "a rock and roll masterpiece". He also released two live efforts in 2020, Live at the Mercy Lounge and Live at the High Watt.

In 2021, he produced the highly acclaimed debut album for Morgan Wade, Reckless, as well as playing guitar on that record. In 2022, he produced  Blue Dogs album Big Dreamers.

Discography

References

External links 
 
 https://www.jasonisbell.com/
 https://www.wideopencountry.com/sadler-vaden/

1976 births
Living people
Singer-songwriters from North Carolina
Musicians from Charlotte, North Carolina
21st-century American guitarists
21st-century American singers